The Unitary Socialist Party (Partito Socialista Unitario; PSU) was a democratic socialist political party in Italy, active from 1922 to 1930.

History
The party was founded in November 1922 by the reformist wing of the Italian Socialist Party (PSI) led by Rinaldo Rigola, Filippo Turati and Giacomo Matteotti, after they had been expelled in October. A staunch opponent of Benito Mussolini and Fascism, Matteotti was assassinated by Fascists, affiliated to OVRA, in June 1924. The event provoked the Aventine Secession.

Outlawed in November 1925, the PSU became active in clandestinity, as the Italian Workers' Socialist Party (Partito Socialista dei Lavoratori Italiani; PSLI). In June 1930 the PSLI re-joined the PSI.

Leading members and activists of the party included Oddino Morgari, Sandro Pertini, Camillo Prampolini, Claudio Treves and Anna Kulischov.

The party was a member of the Labour and Socialist International between 1923 and 1930.

Electoral results

See also
Unitary Socialist Party (Italy, 1949)
Unified Socialist Party (Italy)

References

Political parties established in 1922
Defunct political parties in Italy
Defunct social democratic parties in Italy
Political parties disestablished in 1930
Members of the Labour and Socialist International
1922 establishments in Italy
Anti-fascist organisations in Italy